Faceless is a 2016 Canadian-Afghan Persian-language action film.

Plot
In 2015 Afghanistan, an aimless young man named Sameer does his best to take care of his younger brother, Nasir as their parents are dead. Sameer suffers from dyslexia and practices Asian martial arts with limited success. His neighborhood is controlled by gangsters led by Zabeer who want him and Nasir to sell drugs. Sameer longs to end the victimisation of ordinary people like himself at the hand of criminals protected by the state, but feels powerless. After hearing a mystical call, Sameer finds a necklace wrapped around a skeleton in the ruins of an old palace.

Sameer starts to wear the necklace. While picking up Nasir at his school, a terrorist suicide bomber arrives and Sameer discovers the necklace allows him to magically slow down time. Taking advantage of this power, he uses his martial art skills to kill the terrorist. Empowered by the necklace, Sameer dons a mask and works as a vigilante, killing the criminals of Afghanistan and becomes known to the public as the "Faceless Hero". Sameer finds Nasir is selling drugs for Zabeer and sends him away to his martial arts teacher, Coach Ahmadi. Ahmadi tells Sameer that it was his destiny to find the magical necklace and be a hero.

While the corrupt policeman Ali seeks to hunt him down, Sameer befriends a sympathetic newswoman, Nilofar, telling her that the Afghan state is so systematically corrupt that vigilantism is justified. When Sameer kills Zabeer, one of his men survives and tells Ali who the "Faceless Hero" is. Sameer rescues a 13-year-old girl, Maria, who ran away from an arranged marriage, causing her jilted would-to-be husband to falsely accuse her of burning the Koran. Sameer battles an enraged mob seeking to lynch Maria. After saving Maria, his house is attacked by Ali and his men. Sameer triumphs despite temporarily losing his magical necklace. After defeating Ali, Sameer spares his life, hoping that the state will bring him to justice for his crimes. Instead Ali is freed by his fellow policemen, but he is executed for his failure by his paymasters. Sameer resolves to continue his vigilante  work until Afghanistan is cleansed of crime and corruption.

Cast
 Humayoon Shams Khan-Sameer
 Rahmatullah Khostai-Ali
 Farahnaz Nawabi-Maria
 Abrar Shams Khan-Nasir
 Farzana Nawabi-Nilofar
 Nasima Nawabi-Maria's mother
 Shahwali Nawabi-Maria's father
 Asad Tajzal-Rahman

Production
The film was scripted and directed by Ali Akbar Kamal, an Afghan-Canadian filmmaker who disliked the way his homeland was portrayed in the West and decided to make a film that told a story from an Afghan viewpoint. Kamal, a graduate of the Toronto Film School, decided to make the first Afghan superhero film as a way of rebutting Western stereotypes about Afghanistan. The film was shot on location in Kabul in June–July 2016.

Reception
Through mostly ignored in the West, the film was described as a "great success" in Afghanistan.

References

2016 films
2016 action films
Canadian action films
2010s Persian-language films
Dari-language films
Afghan drama films
Films set in Afghanistan
Films shot in Afghanistan
2010s Canadian films